The Evryscopes are a set of rapid-cadence, gigapixel-scale telescopes. Each instrument contains an array of up to 24 camera units, each consisting of a  telescope (85 mm Rokinon DSLR lens) paired to a thermoelectrically cooled astronomical CCD. The camera units are arranged around a solid fiberglass structure to form a continuous field of view of 9216 sq. deg. 

The first instrument (Evryscope-South) was deployed in May 2015 to Cerro Tololo Inter-American Observatory, where it is co-located with the PROMPT Telescopes. The second instrument (Evryscope-North) was deployed in October 2018 to Mount Laguna Observatory. 

Evryscope-South is funded by NSF/ATI and NSF/CAREER and was designed and built at the University of North Carolina at Chapel Hill. Evryscope-North is funded in collaboration with San Diego State University.

The Argus Array Pathfinder a technological successor with 38 camera will start operations in October 2022 at Norh Carolina with hopes of paving the way for definite Argus Array with a total of 900 cameras by 2025 which should replace the CCD technology with MOSFET detectors.

See also
 List of astronomical observatories
 Lists of telescopes

References

External links

 The Evryscope website

Astronomical observatories in Chile
Optical telescopes
Buildings and structures in Coquimbo Region
University of North Carolina at Chapel Hill